The Virgil and Beulah Crum House is a house located in northeast Portland, Oregon, listed on the National Register of Historic Places.

See also
 National Register of Historic Places listings in Northeast Portland, Oregon

References

External links
 

Houses on the National Register of Historic Places in Portland, Oregon
Houses completed in 1926
1926 establishments in Oregon
Beaumont-Wilshire, Portland, Oregon
Portland Historic Landmarks